Corquoy is a commune in the Cher department in the Centre-Val de Loire region of France. On 1 January 2019, the former commune Sainte-Lunaise was merged into Corquoy.

Geography

Population

Sights
 The twelfth-century church of St. Martin.
 The thirteenth-century chapel of the old priory of Grandmont.

See also
Communes of the Cher department

References

Communes of Cher (department)